The Nadir crater is an undersea feature on the Guinea Plateau in the Atlantic Ocean,  off the coast of Guinea. It is suggested to be an impact crater. The feature is named after the Nadir Seamount, located 100 km to the south, and is around 8.5-km-wide. The paper announcing the discovery of the feature was published in Science Advances in 2022. It has been proposed that the structure be drilled to confirm/disprove the impact origin.

Impact event
The crater features all characteristics of an impact event: appropriate ratio of width to depth, the height of the rims, and the height of the central uplift. It was formed at or near the Cretaceous–Paleogene boundary about 66 million years ago, around the same age as the Chicxulub crater. Numerical simulations of crater formation suggested a sea impact at the depth of around 800 m of a ≥400-m asteroid. It would have produced a fireball with a radius of >5 km, instant vaporization of water and sediment near the seabed, tsunami waves up to 1 kilometer high around the crater and substantial amounts of greenhouse gases released from shallow buried black shale deposits. A magnitude 6.5–7 earthquake would have also been produced. The estimated energy yield would have been around 2×1019 Joules (around 5000 megatons). 

To constrain the age of the crater, which now has an uncertainty in the structure's age of about one million years, and to confirm the impact nature of the event, drilling sediment cores from the crater and testing of minerals from the crater floor is key and has been proposed.

Impactor
The impactor is estimated to be around 400 m in diameter, roughly equivalent to the size of the Bennu asteroid. The authors of the paper speculated that it may have been part of a binary asteroid with the Chicxulub impactor or part of an impact cluster, but it is also probable that is unrelated. Impacts similar in size to Nadir occur on average every 50,000 to 100,000 years.

References

Geology of the Atlantic Ocean
Cretaceous–Paleogene boundary
Possible impact craters on Earth